The following Confederate States Army units and commanders fought in the Battle of New Market in the American Civil War. The Union order of battle is shown separately.

Abbreviations used

Military rank
 MG = Major General
 BG = Brigadier General
 Col = Colonel
 Ltc = Lieutenant Colonel
 Maj = Major
 Cpt = Captain
 Lt = Lieutenant

Other
 (w) = wounded
 (mw) = mortally wounded
 (k) = killed in action
 (c) = captured

Department of Western Virginia
MG John C. Breckinridge, commanding

Notes

References
 
 Davis, William C. The Battle of New Market. Harrisburg, Pennsylvania: Stackpole Books, 1993.
 Knight, Charles R. Valley Thunder: The Battle of New Market and the Opening of the Shenandoah Valley Campaign, May 1864. Savas Beatie, 2010. .

Confederate order of battle
American Civil War orders of battle